Cuxhaven is an independent town and seat of the Cuxhaven district, in Lower Saxony, Germany. The town includes the northernmost point of Lower Saxony. It is situated on the shore of the North Sea at the mouth of the Elbe River. Its town quarters Duhnen, Döse and Sahlenburg are especially popular vacation spots on the North Sea and home to about 52,000 residents.

Cuxhaven is home to an important fisherman's wharf and ship registration point for Hamburg as well as the Kiel Canal until 2008. Tourism is also of great importance. The city and its precursor Ritzebüttel belonged to Hamburg from the 13th century until 1937. The island of Neuwerk, a Hamburg dependency, is located just northwest of Cuxhaven in the North Sea. The city's symbol, known as the Kugelbake, is a beacon once used as a lighthouse; the wooden landmark on the mouth of the Elbe marks the boundary between the river and the North Sea and also adorns the city's coat of arms.

History 

Ritzebüttel, today a part of Cuxhaven, belonged to the Land of Hadeln, first an exclave of the younger Duchy of Saxony and after its de facto dynastic partition in 1296 of the Duchy of Saxe-Lauenburg, established de jure in 1260. In 1394 the city of Hamburg conquered the fortress of Ritzebüttel and made it its stronghold to protect the estuary of the river Elbe, which connects that city with the open sea.

The Hamburg America Line built a large ocean liner terminal at Cuxhaven in 1900. Connected directly to Hamburg by a dedicated railway line and station, it served as the major departure point for German and European emigrants until 1969 when ocean liner travel ceased. The ornate assembly hall and associated buildings survived wartime damage and peacetime urban renewal to be restored in 1998 for use as a museum and cruise ship terminal.

On 15 March 1907 Cuxhaven gained city status within the state of Hamburg. In 1937 Cuxhaven became an urban district of the Stade Region within the Prussian Province of Hanover by the Greater Hamburg Act. In 1972 some municipalities of the neighboured rural district of Land of Hadeln were incorporated into the urban district of Cuxhaven. In 1977 Cuxhaven lost the status as urban district and was integrated into the new rural District of Cuxhaven, being its capital.

During the First World War Nordholz Airbase with its airship hangars, near Nordholz to the south of Cuxhaven, was one of the major Imperial German Navy airship stations. On Christmas Day 1914 it was attacked by Royal Navy seaplanes in the Cuxhaven Raid. It subsequently became a strategically important city as German authorities and civilians feared it would be the site of an Allied invasion.

During the Second World War, the town hosted a base of a Wehrmacht radio network, codenamed BROWN, which transmitted data regarding experimental weapon developments, including rocketry. From this location the last ENIGMA-code encrypted message of the war was transmitted on 7 May 1945. It reported the arrival of British troops and ends: "Closing down for ever - all the best - goodbye."
 
Between 1945 and 1964 the Hermann-Oberth-Gesellschaft performed various civilian experiments in rocketry near Cuxhaven.

Tourism 
 
The origins of tourism go back to the year 1816 when a seaside resort was founded in Cuxhaven. Since 1964 Cuxhaven has been a state-recognized climate seaside resort (Seeheilbad) and centre of the so-called holiday region of Cuxland.

Geographical and cultural background 
The town is served by Cuxhaven station.

At low tide the water recedes so far from the coast that the island can be reached either by mudflat hiking or by horse carriage.

A modern landmark of Cuxhaven is the Friedrich-Clemens-Gerke Tower, a telecommunication tower built of concrete, which is not accessible to the public. It is not really a landmark, for many cities in Germany have a similar tower.

The high-test peroxide (HTP) submarine U 1407, was raised from where she had been scuttled in Cuxhaven after WWII and rebuilt by the British, being commissioned as HMS Meteorite. It was the catalyst for a series of German-made Air-independent propulsion submarines such as the Type 212 submarine and Type 214 submarine.

Twin towns – sister cities

Cuxhaven is twinned with:
 Binz, Germany (1990)
 Hafnarfjörður, Iceland (1988)
 Penzance, England, United Kingdom (1967–1974, 2009–present)
 Sassnitz, Germany (1990)
 Vannes, France (1963)

Notable people

Carsten Niebuhr (1733–1815), mathematician, cartographer and explorer
Joachim Ringelnatz (1883–1934), poet, cabaret artiste and painter. Since 2002 the city hosts the Joachim Ringelnatz-Museum, managed by the Joachim Ringelnatz-Foundation.
Anna Strohsahl (1885–1953), first woman city councillor in Cuxhaven
Curt Rothenberger (1896–1959), lawyer and Nazi politician
Rainer Feist (1945–2007), Admiral, Deputy Supreme Commander of the NATO – HQ
Jochen Fraatz (born 1963), handball player, member of the national team
Gunnar Sauer (born 1964), footballer
Stefanie Schneider (born 1968), photographer/artist
Volker Neumüller (born 1969), music manager and former DSDS jury member
Constantin Schreiber (born 1979), journalist and author
Lena Petermann (born 1994), footballer

Climate
Cuxhaven has an oceanic climate (Köppen: Cfb).

See also 
 Rocket experiments in the area of Cuxhaven
 Operation Backfire

References

External links 

 Official site 
 Operation "Backfire" and rocket experiments at Cuxhaven 
 Further Tourist Information

 
Rocket launch sites in Germany
Towns in Lower Saxony
Populated places established in 1907
Port cities and towns in Germany
Port cities and towns of the North Sea
Populated riverside places in Germany
Populated places on the Elbe
Seaside resorts in Germany
Populated coastal places in Germany (North Sea)